Intervention is a 2007 British drama film directed by Mary McGuckian. It won the Best Feature Film award at the 2007 San Diego Film Festival.

The film only played in one theater and made a total of $279 at the box office during its entire theatrical run.

Cast 
 Donna D'Errico - Pamela
 Charles Dance - Private Investigator
 Gary Farmer - Bob
 Colm Feore - Bill
 Kerry Fox - Kate
 Jenny Gabrielle - Olivia
 Rupert Graves - Mark
 Ian Hart - Harry III Jr
 Andie MacDowell - Kelly
Jennifer Tilly - Jane

References

External links 

2007 drama films
2007 films
British drama films
2000s English-language films
2000s British films